Michael Alastair Spink (born April 1966) is a British property developer  and founder of SPINK, a British architectural design practice and master builder.

Biography 
In 2011, Spink sold historic Grade II Listed country house Park Place, near Henley-on-Thames, to Andrey Borodin for £140m. At the time, Park Place was Britain's most expensive home. In 2014, his company bought the disused Brompton Road underground station for redevelopment. Fayland House, built for Spink in 2013, was named best house in the Architectural Review House Awards 2015.

Personal life 
Spink married Maria Gripenberg in 2003.

References

External links
Spink Property

1966 births
Real estate and property developers
Living people
Architects from Yorkshire